Ambivere is a comune (municipality) in the Province of Bergamo in the Italian region of Lombardy, located about  northeast of Milan and about  west of Bergamo.

Ambivere borders the following municipalities: Mapello, Palazzago, Pontida, Sotto il Monte Giovanni XXIII.

Demographic evolution

References

Articles which contain graphical timelines